is a Japanese-registered whale catcher that undertakes whaling operations in the North Pacific Ocean and Southern Ocean. Along with other vessels of the Japanese whaling fleet, she has been featured on American television since 2008, in the documentary-style reality series Whale Wars.

Gallery

See also
 Whaling in Japan
 Institute of Cetacean Research

References

Whaling ships
Whaling in Japan
1998 ships
Ships built in Japan